Eva Ritvo is an American television and radio personality, author, and psychiatrist most noted for her work on women's empowerment issues and self-help books. She is the co-founder of the Bold Beauty Project  and the founder of Bekindr.

She is an internationally known expert practicing in Miami Beach, Florida. In private medical practice, she has more than a twenty-year career in treating individuals, couples, and families. As a public expert, she has made frequent public speaking and television appearances including NBC's TODAY Show and a special segment on EXTRA called "Beauty and the Brain". She had a long running TV segment called "Real Relationship". She has been featured in the Miami Herald, The New York Times , New York Times Magazine, The Daily News Celebrity Watch, USA Today, The Wall Street Journal, WebMD, SELF magazine, Good Housekeeping, O Magazine, Allure  and others. She is a regular guest on radio show called Brain Food for the Heartland and is on numerous radio shows around the county. TV Host PBS Series Techversify

Education and medical career
Ritvo completed her residency training at New York Hospital Payne Whitney Clinic/ Cornell University and received undergraduate and medical degrees from University of California, Los Angeles. She is the former vice chair of the Department of Psychiatry and Behavioral Sciences, University of Miami Miller School of Medicine where she remains as an Associate Professor on the voluntary faculty. She is a Distinguished Fellow of the American Psychiatric Association, a member of the American College of Psychiatry, and the International Society of Sports Psychiatry.

Author
Ritvo has written and lectured extensively in the US and internationally on the science and meaning of kindness, on beauty, and on women's empowerment issues. Ritvo has written book chapters and articles on topics that include body dysmorphic disorder, managing patient expectations, and handling difficult patients. She is the co-author of the best-selling self-help book "The Beauty Prescription" (McGraw-Hill, 2008). She is the lead author of "The Concise Guide to Marriage and Family Therapy" (American Psychiatric Pub.,2002) and has written the chapters on family and couples therapy for leading psychiatric textbooks. Ritvo is the author of "Bekindr: The Transformative Power of Kindness" (Momosa Publishing, 2017,2018).

Causes
At the Miller School of Medicine, Ritvo initiated the Margaret Ann Aitcheson Humanitarian Award named in honor of Tipper Gore's mother and first recipient. The award honors those who have made an outstanding contribution in the field of mental health. Ritvo is an active member of the Board of the United Cerebral Palsy Foundation and has been recognized as the UCP Volunteer of the Year. Ritvo hosts the Annual Marissa Nestor Tennis Invitational to raise funds for the organization as well as assisting in numerous other events throughout the year.

References

External links
 The Beauty Prescription, McGraw-Hill
Official Site: Dr. Eva Ritvo
NBC Extra:Beauty Prescription, with Dr. Debra Luftman and Dr. Eva Ritvo
"Going to Extremes: Beauty Prescription" Psychology Today
10 Ways to Think Yourself Beautiful, MSN Glo

American advice columnists
American women columnists
American psychiatrists
Cornell University alumni
Writers from Miami
Living people
David Geffen School of Medicine at UCLA alumni
American women psychiatrists
Year of birth missing (living people)
21st-century American women